Brian Kendall may refer to:

 Brian Kendall (One Life to Live), a character in the American soap opera One Life to Live
 Brian Kendall (boxer) (1947–1998), New Zealand boxer